= Kinito (French band) =

French punk rock band

Kinito is a French punk rock band that originated in Fontainebleau. They released their first album, "2,5L De Pur Rock", in 2004. They also released the singles La Maison de Disques, J'Sais Pas Danser, and Regarde.
